The 1993 Buffalo Bills season was the 34th season for the team in the National Football League (NFL). The Buffalo Bills finished the National Football League's 1993 season with a record of 12 wins and 4 losses, and finished first in the AFC East division.

The Bills qualified for their fourth straight Super Bowl, where they faced the Dallas Cowboys in a rematch of the previous season's Super Bowl. However, just like with the previous Super Bowl, the Bills would lose to the Cowboys, this time by a score of 13–30. Until the 2020 season, this Bills squad was the last to reach the AFC Championship Game.

Season summary
Despite the many jokes about the Bills having lost three straight Super Bowls—a fan pleaded with head coach Marv Levy for the team to not return to the Super Bowl: "I can't take it. I can't go to work on Monday if we don't win the game. It's tearing me up. I can't handle it"—Don Beebe recalled that "I've got to be honest with you. We thrived in it. We enjoyed it. We were going to go to four ... I think that comes a lot from the Winston Churchill poems and the speeches that we would get from Marv". Dan Patrick reported that "Buffalo players have been wearing t-shirts reading something along the lines of 'Let's Tick Them Off and Go for Four'". The team qualified for another Super Bowl; they became the first franchise to win four consecutive conference championships, as well as the first to appear in four consecutive Super Bowls.

Defensive end Bruce Smith was named NEA Defensive Player of the Year, and tied for the league lead with 13.5 sacks. Smith, linebacker Darryl Talley and special teams gunner Steve Tasker were named to the 1993 All-Pro team. The Bills' 47 defensive takeaways in 1993 is the third-highest total of the 1990s.

Running back Thurman Thomas led the AFC with 1,315 rushing yards.

NFL Draft

Personnel

Roster

Regular season

Schedule

Game summaries

Week 1

Week 2

Week 3

Week 5

Week 6

Week 8

Week 9

November 1, 1993.

Week 12

Week 13

Week 14

Week 15

Week 16

Standings

Playoffs

Super Bowl XXVIII

Scoring Summary
DAL – FG: Eddie Murray 41 yards 3–0 DAL
BUF – FG: Steve Christie 54 yards 3–3 tie
DAL – FG: Eddie Murray 24 yards 6–3 DAL
BUF – TD: Thurman Thomas 4 yard run (Steve Christie kick) 10–6 BUF
BUF – FG: Steve Christie 28 yards 13–6 BUF
DAL – TD: James Washington 46 yard fumble return (Eddie Murray kick) 13–13 tie
DAL – TD: Emmitt Smith 17 yard run (Eddie Murray kick) 20–13 DAL
DAL – TD: Emmitt Smith 1 yard run (Eddie Murray kick) 27–13 DAL
DAL – FG: Eddie Murray 20 yards 30–13 DAL

Awards and records
 Nate Odomes, Tied NFL Lead, 9 Interceptions
 Bruce Smith, Newspaper Enterprise Association Defensive Player of the Year Award
 Thurman Thomas, AFC Leader, 1,315 Rushing Yards

References

 Bills on Pro Football Reference
 Bills on jt-sw.com
 Bills Stats on jt-sw.com

Buffalo Bills
AFC East championship seasons
American Football Conference championship seasons
Buffalo Bills seasons
Buff